Pramod Jain Bhaya is an Indian National Congress politician from the state of Rajasthan. He is the Cabinet Minister of Mines and cow rearing in Third Ashok Gehlot ministry. He is a third time MLA. Previously he served as an MLA from 2003 to 2008 and as a minister from 2008 to 2011 in the term 2008 to 2013.

Constituency
He represents the Anta (Rajasthan Assembly constituency) Assembly constituency from Rajasthan.

Positions Held

References 

Living people
Rajasthan MLAs 2018–2023
State cabinet ministers of Rajasthan
Indian National Congress politicians from Rajasthan
1965 births